Paper Tiger is a 2019 stand-up comedy special by American comedian Bill Burr. Released via Netflix on September 10, 2019, it was filmed at the Royal Albert Hall in London and directed by filmmaker Mike Binder. Burr performed at the Royal Albert Hall for the first time on June 6, 2018, returning in 2019 to perform extra dates on March 4 and 5 for his show, which was then named 50. Paper Tiger was nominated at the 63rd Annual Grammy Awards for Best Comedy Album.

Synopsis
The central subjects of Paper Tiger are cancel culture, the Me Too movement, people who spread misandry under the guise of feminism, Burr's anger issues and childhood, Elvis Presley's legacy of cultural appropriation, and Burr and his wife having to give up their beloved but "deranged" rescue pit bull when his wife became pregnant.

Reception 
On Rotten Tomatoes, the film holds  rating from critics. Forbes compared Paper Tiger to Dave Chappelle's 2019 special Sticks & Stones, saying that both specials are framed as a backlash against outrage culture. The Washington Post cited Vulture describing the special as "thoughtful, surprising, introspective", noted the show's "risk of offensiveness" as being in a similar vein with Chappelle's release while pointing out the necessity to "defend the right to be offensive".

Paper Tiger was nominated at the 63rd Annual Grammy Awards for Best Comedy Album.

References

External links
 

2019 films
2019 comedy films
Films directed by Mike Binder
Films shot in London
Netflix specials
Stand-up comedy concert films
2010s English-language films